Breweries in Alaska produce a wide range of beers in different styles that are marketed locally, regionally, and nationally. In 2012, Alaska's 21 breweries, importers, brewpubs, packagers, and wholesalers employed more than 250 people directly in brewing activities, and another 2200 in related jobs such as wholesaling and retailing. Including people directly employed in brewing, as well as those who supply Alaska's breweries with everything from ingredients to machinery, the total business and personal tax revenue generated by Alaska's breweries and related industries was more than $73 million. Consumer purchases of Alaska's brewery products generated another $23 million in tax revenue. In 2012, according to the Brewers Association, Alaska ranked 4th in per capita craft breweries with 22.

For context, at the end of 2013 there were 2,822 breweries in the United States, including 2,768 craft breweries.  In that same year, according to the Beer Institute, the brewing industry employed around 43,000 Americans in brewing and distribution and had a combined economic impact of more than $246 billion.

Since the turn of the century, the number of craft breweries in Alaska has increased dramatically, reflecting a nationwide trend in the United States.

Alaskan breweries struggle with strict liquor regulations that keep their onsite sales limited to 36 ounces per person per day, closing times at 8pm and disallow TVs, gaming and live entertainment.  Some breweries like the 49th State Brewing Company, Matanuska Brewing, and now Anchorage Brewing have picked up more extensive liquor licenses to get around the red tape

Breweries

Operating breweries

 49th State Brewing Company (est. 2010) – Healy and Anchorage
 Alaskan Brewing Company (est. 1986) – Juneau
 Alpenglow Brewery (est. 2021) Anchorage
 Anchorage Brewing Company (est. 2010) – Anchorage
 Arkose Brewery (est. 2011) – Palmer
 Baleen Brewing Company (est. 2018) - Ketchikan
 Barnaby Brewing Company (est. 2017) - Juneau
 Bawden Street Brewing Company (est. 2018) - Ketchikan
 Bearpaw River Brewing Company (est. 2015) – Wasilla
 Black Spruce Brewing Company (est. 2018) - Fairbanks
 Bleeding Heart Brewery (est. 2016)<ref>Merritt, Steven (April 10, 2016). "Bleeding Heart Brewery latest to enter local craft-beer scene", Mat-Su Valley Frontiersman. Retrieved July 9, 2016.</ref> – Palmer
 Brewerks (est. 2021) - Anchorage
 Broken Tooth Brewing (est. 1996) – Anchorage
 Cooper Landing Brewing Company (est. 2017) - Cooper Landing
 Cynosure Brewing (est. 2016) – Anchorage
 Denali Brewing Company (est. 2009) – Talkeetna
 Devil's Club Brewing Company (est. 2018) - Juneau
 Forbidden Peak Brewery (est. 2019) - Juneau
 Gakona Brewery & Supply Company (est. 2015) – Gakona
 Girdwood Brewing Company (est. 2017) - Girdwood
 Glacier Brewhouse (est. 1996) – Anchorage
 Grace Ridge Brewing (est. 2016) – Homer
 Growler Bay Brewing Company (est. 2020) - Valdez
 Haines Brewing Company (est. 1999) – Haines
 Harbor Mountain Brewing Company (est. 2020) - Sitka
 Homer Brewing Company (est. 1996) – Homer 
 HooDoo Brewing Company (est. 2012) – Fairbanks
 Icy Strait Brewing (est. 2015)Jenkins, Elizabeth (August 15, 2015). "Can We Call It Hoo-Brew? New Brewery Opens in Hoonah", Alaska Public Media. Retrieved March 3, 2016. – Hoonah
 Kassik's Kenai Brew Stop (est. 2006) – Nikiski
 Kenai River Brewing Company (est. 2006) – Soldotna
 King Street Brewing Company (est. 2010) – Anchorage
 Klondike Brewing Company (est. 2018) - Skagway
 Kodiak Island Brewing Company (est. 2003) – Kodiak
 Last Frontier Brewing Company (est. 2010) – Wasilla
 Latitude 65 Brewing Company (est. 2021) - Fairbanks
 Lazy Mountain Brewing Company (est. 2019) — Palmer
 Matanuska Brewing Company (est. 2018) - Palmer
 Midnight Sun Brewing Company (est. 1995) – Anchorage
 Midnight Mine Brewing Company (est. 2019) - Fairbanks
 Naptowne Brewing Company (est. 2023) - Sterling
 Odd Man Rush Brewing (est. 2015) – Eagle River
 Olds River Brewing Company (est. 2020) - Kodiak
 Onsite Brewing Company (est. 2019) − Anchorage
 Raven's Ring Brewing Company (est. 2022) - Anchorage
 Roughwoods Inn & Café (est. 2013) - Nenana
 Seward Brewing Company (est. 2014) – Seward
 Silver Gulch Brewing & Bottling Company (est. 1998) – Fox
 Skagway Brewing Company – Skagway
 St. Elias Brewing Company (est. 2007) – Soldotna
 Stoney Creek Brewhouse (est. 2021) - Seward
 Turnagain Brewing (est. 2018) - Anchorage
 Valdez Brewing (est. 2019) - Valdez
 Copper River Brewing (est. 2022) - Cordova

Closed breweries
 Alaska Brewing Company (1900-1901) - Nome
 Arctic Brewing (1907-1910) – Fairbanks
 Baranof Island Brewing Company (2010-2019) – Sitka
 Barphel Brewing Company (1905-1919) – Fairbanks
 Douglas City Brewing Company (1902-1906) - Douglas
 Eagle Brewing Company (1904-1906) - Eagle
 Fairbanks Brewing (1906-1907) – Fairbanks
 Gold Rush Brewing (2010-2017) - Skagway
 Juneau Brewing and Malting Company (1900-1904) - Juneau
 Pioneer Brewing Company (1934-1937) – Fairbanks
 Prinz Brau (1976-1979) – Anchorage
 Railway Brewing Company (1996-1998) - Anchorage
 Ravens Ridge (1994-1995) – Fairbanks
 Regal Eagle Brewing (1995-2003) - Eagle River
 Resolution Brewing Company (2015-2021) - Anchorage
 Skagway Brewing Company (1897-1902) - Skagway
 Sleeping Lady Brewing Company (1996-2015) – Anchorage
 Quake Brewing Company (2016-2017) - Wasilla
Valdez Brewing Company (1903-1909) - Valdez

See also
 Beer in the United States
 List of breweries in the United States
 List of microbreweries
 Mead in Alaska

References

Further reading
 "Drink Locally", Anchorage Daily News, November 5, 2010
 "Peninsula Beers", Anchorage Press, May 11, 2011

External links
 "The United States of Beer: Alaska", Poor Taste Magazine'', April 4, 2011
 Alaskan beers on Reddit
 Brewer's Guild of Alaska website

 

Alaska
Lists of buildings and structures in Alaska